is a train station in Kurashiki, Okayama Prefecture, Japan.

Lines
West Japan Railway Company
Honshi-Bisan Line

History 
Kaminocho station opened on 20 March 1988.

Adjacent stations

|-
!colspan=5|JR West

References 

Railway stations in Okayama Prefecture
Stations of West Japan Railway Company